Quadrangular Tower, or Keeper of the Fortress of Baku, is a stone keep built in the 14th century. It is part of the Old City in Baku, Azerbaijan. On August 2, 2001, the building was declared a "national architectural monument" by the Cabinet of Azerbaijan.

History
The tower was built in the 14th century and was an integral part of the fortress wall and the defensive fortifications in Baku. Construction was done to maintain the architecture and integrity of the fortress walls. The towers were built to make the defense system easier. According to medieval authors, within 70 semicircular and northern walls of the Baku Fortress Wall was a quadrangular fortress-type tower. In the Middle Ages it was used as an armory.  The tower was built to store weapons and to further strengthen the northern part of Baku.

In 2014, substantial repair and restoration works were held on the tower by the Old City State Historical-Architectural Reserve Department. After that, it started to operate as the Old City Traditional Art Center under the name "The Tower of Arts."

Architectural features
The height of the tower is 16 meters, the thickness of the walls is 2 meters. For rapid movement of soldiers, a tunnel continued along the bottom of the wall towards the tower gate. This tunnel surrounded the city on the northern side.

Gallery

See also
Old City (Baku)

References

Buildings and structures in Baku
Castles and fortresses in Azerbaijan
Buildings and structures completed in the 14th century
Monuments and memorials in Azerbaijan
Azerbaijani culture
Tourist attractions in Baku
Tourist attractions in Azerbaijan
Icherisheher